"Dance!" is a song credited to Goleo VI featuring Lumidee and Fatman Scoop. It is included on the FIFA World Cup 2006 soundtrack album and contains Scorccio sample replays of the chorus of Whitney Houston's "I Wanna Dance with Somebody" and beats from the Coolie Dance riddim, both produced by Mark Summers.

Track listing
Single CD-maxi
"Dance!" (Radio Edit) - 3:37
"Dance!" (Club Remix) - 4:54
Goleo VI & Pachanga - "Hip Hop Hooray" (Reggaeton Remix) - 4:31
Bonusclip - "Dance!" - 3:38

Chart performance

Weekly charts

Year-end charts

References

Lumidee songs
Fatman Scoop songs
Songs written by Lumidee
2006 singles
Songs written by George Merrill (songwriter)
2006 songs
Songs written by Fatman Scoop
Songs written by Shannon Rubicam